Mihail Minkov (born 6 February 1993) is a Bulgarian professional footballer who plays as a defender for Yantra Gabrovo.

Career
Minkov is a product of the Vidima-Rakovski Sevlievo academy and it was there that he made his A PFG debut.

In July 2015, Minkov joined Etar Veliko Tarnovo. On 15 August 2017, his contract was terminated by mutual consent. On 16 August 2017, Minkov signed with Litex Lovech.

In June 2018, Minkov joined Dobrudzha Dobrich.

References

External links

1993 births
Living people
People from Bansko
Bulgarian footballers
First Professional Football League (Bulgaria) players
Second Professional Football League (Bulgaria) players
PFC Vidima-Rakovski Sevlievo players
PFC Kaliakra Kavarna players
FC Oborishte players
FC Bansko players
SFC Etar Veliko Tarnovo players
PFC Litex Lovech players
PFC Dobrudzha Dobrich players
FC Lokomotiv Gorna Oryahovitsa players
FC CSKA 1948 Sofia players
Association football central defenders
Sportspeople from Blagoevgrad Province
21st-century Bulgarian people